Bhuna is a small town in Fatehabad District of the state of Haryana, India. Arpana Pankaj Pasrija is the chairperson of Nagar Palika Bhuna. Bhuna is an old village with Bishnois, Jats, Punjabis, Sardars, and Dalits. It has a Ranadhir Mandir dedicated to Baba Ranadhir.

See also
Baba Ranadhir

References 

Cities and towns in Fatehabad district